is a 2014 Japanese martial arts film directed by Kazuhiro Yokoyama.

Cast
Kanon Miyahara as Sakura Yamanami
Risako Itō as Fuyumi Igarashi
Mayu Kawamoto as Asuka Gondo
Hirona Nagashima as Miku
Kaede Aono as Maki Akagi
Ryu Nakatani as Teacher Tanaka
Chisato Morishita as J Rose
Nana Shirai as Fuega/J Kid
Shingo Koyasu as Owashi

References

External links

Japanese martial arts films
2014 martial arts films
2010s Japanese films